Dalbe is a village in Cena Parish, Jelgava Municipality in the Semigallia region of Latvia. The village located at Misa river approximately 28 km from the capital Riga and 14 km from the city of Jelgava.

References

Towns and villages in Latvia
Jelgava Municipality
Semigallia